Robert LeGrand Backman (March 22, 1922 – June 3, 2022) was an American lawyer and politician in the state of Utah who was a general authority of the Church of Jesus Christ of Latter-day Saints (LDS Church) from 1978 until his death.

Early life
Backman was born in Salt Lake City, Utah, but spent much of his youth in South Africa, where his father, LeGrand Backman, was president of the LDS Church's South African Mission. After returning to Utah for his last year of high school, Backman later served as a missionary in the church's Northern States Mission, headquartered in Chicago, Illinois. Backman served in the U.S. Army in the Philippines during the Second World War. Following the war, he enrolled at the law school at the University of Utah. He was a member of the Utah House of Representatives for two terms.

LDS Church service
Before his call as a general authority, Backman served as president of the church's Northwestern States Mission, based in Portland, Oregon, as a temple sealer, and as a regional representative. In 1972, he was briefly the second assistant to W. Jay Eldredge, the general superintendent of the Young Men's Mutual Improvement Association (YMMIA). When the YMMIA was renamed the Aaronic Priesthood–MIA in 1972, Backman was called as its general president. He served in this calling until 1974, when the Aaronic Priesthood–MIA was placed under the direct supervision of the church's presiding bishopric. In 1978, Backman became a member of the church's First Quorum of the Seventy. In 1979, he succeeded Neil D. Schaerrer as the general president of the Young Men organization. Backman is the only man to serve two non-consecutive terms as the general president of the Young Men.

In 1985, Backman was released from the Young Men and became a member of the seven-man Presidency of the Seventy, with Vaughn J. Featherstone succeeding him as president of the Young Men. Backman served in the Presidency of the Seventy until August 1992; in October of that year, he was designated an emeritus general authority.

In 1986, Backman was awarded the Silver Buffalo Award from the Boy Scouts of America for his efforts in incorporating Scouting into the LDS Church's Young Men organization. From 2005 to 2008, Backman was president of the church's Jordan River Utah Temple.

Personal life and death
Backman married Virginia Pickett on July 5, 1941 in the Salt Lake Temple and they had seven daughters; she died on June 4, 1999. He later married Janet Woodbury.

Backman turned 100 on March 22, 2022 and died on June 3 in Murray, Utah.

See also
George I. Cannon: a fellow counselor of Eldredge's at the time of Backman's service
"Elder Jack H Goaslind, Elder Robert L. Backman of the Presidency of the First Quorum of the Seventy", Ensign, November 1985, p. 100

References

External links
Elder Robert LeGrand Backman of the First Quorum of the Seventy

1922 births
2022 deaths
20th-century Mormon missionaries
American Mormon missionaries in the United States
American expatriates in South Africa
American general authorities (LDS Church)
Counselors in the General Presidency of the Young Men (organization)
General Presidents of the Young Men (organization)
Latter Day Saints from Utah
Lawyers from Salt Lake City
Members of the First Quorum of the Seventy (LDS Church)
Members of the Utah House of Representatives
Military personnel from Salt Lake City
Mission presidents (LDS Church)
Politicians from Salt Lake City
Presidents of the Seventy (LDS Church)
Regional representatives of the Twelve
Temple presidents and matrons (LDS Church)
United States Army personnel of World War II
University of Utah alumni
American expatriates in the Philippines
American centenarians
Men centenarians